Nettleton High School may refer to:

 Nettleton High School (Arkansas), Nettleton, Arkansas
 Nettleton High School, Nettleton, Mississippi; in the Nettleton School District